Modesto Cortázar y Leal de Ibarra (15 June 1783, in Briviesca (Burgos) – 25 January 1862, in Madrid) was a Spanish politician and Prime Minister.

Cortázar was a member of the Progressive Party in Spain.

When the government of Valentín Ferraz y Barrau fell on 28 August 1840, he was appointed by Regent María Cristina de Borbón to form a government in which he became acting Prime Minister and also held the post of Minister of Justice. After 2 weeks, he was replaced by Vicente Sancho y Cobertores.

During the Década Moderada, he became in January 1847 President of the Congress of Deputies and in September 1847 Foreign minister in the cabinet of Florencio García Goyena.

References 

1783 births
1862 deaths
Prime Ministers of Spain
Foreign ministers of Spain
Progressive Party (Spain) politicians
Presidents of the Congress of Deputies (Spain)